Veronica Anne Latsko (born December 12, 1995) is an American soccer player who plays as a forward for OL Reign of the National Women's Soccer League (NWSL).

College career

The University of Virginia, 2014–2017
Latsko made 93 appearances for the Cavaliers during her four-year college career. In 2014 and 2017 she appeared in every game for Virginia. In 2017 she tied the UVA single-game record for points and was and All-ACC first team selection.

Club career

Houston Dash, 2018–21
Latsko was selected by the Houston Dash with the 28th pick in the 2018 NWSL College Draft. On March 24 she officially signed with the club and made her debut the following day against the Chicago Red Stars.

Latsko scored her first career goal on May 18 against Sky Blue FC, her goal was the game-winning goal in a 3–2 win for Houston. She also scored the game-winning goal on May 24 against the Seattle Reign. It was Houston's first ever win over Seattle.

Loan to Adelaide United, 2018–19
Latsko signed with Adelaide United for the 2018–19 W-League season, alongside Houston Dash teammate Amber Brooks. Latsko finished tied for second in the Golden Boot race with 9 goals, 4 behind Golden Boot winner Sam Kerr.

Loan to Sydney, 2019–20
Latsko returned to Australia for the 2019–20 W-League season, signing on loan with Sydney FC joining Houston Dash teammate Sofia Huerta.

Honors
 with OL Reign
 The Women's Cup: 2022
 NWSL Shield: 2022

References

External links

 
 

Living people
National Women's Soccer League players
Houston Dash players
Adelaide United FC (A-League Women) players
Sydney FC (A-League Women) players
People from Washington County, Pennsylvania
Soccer players from Pennsylvania
American women's soccer players
Virginia Cavaliers women's soccer players
1995 births
Houston Dash draft picks
Sportspeople from the Pittsburgh metropolitan area
Women's association football forwards
OL Reign players